The Telfair County School District is a public school district in Telfair County, Georgia, United States, based in McRae. It serves the communities of Helena, Jacksonville, Lumber City, McRae, Milan, and Scotland. First established as McRae Public School, December 16, 1897, as recorded in the Acts of the General Assembly of The State of Georgia, published 1898.

Schools
The Telfair County School District has one elementary school, one middle school, and one high school.

Elementary schools
Telfair County Elementary School - built in 2004.

Middle school
Telfair County Middle School - The school consists of 6th, 7th, and 8th Grades.  Athletically, TCMS is a member of the Oconee River Middle School Conference and fields competitive sports teams in fastpitch softball, football, cross country, basketball, baseball, golf, track, and tennis.
 Principal -  Christopher D. Ellis
 Assistant Principal - Rodney Moore
 Assistant Principal - Shelby Meeks
 Counselor - Gladys Hall

High school
Telfair County High School - The school mascot is the Trojan, and school sports include baseball, basketball, football, track, tennis, softball, and wrestling.

References

External links

School districts in Georgia (U.S. state)
Education in Telfair County, Georgia